Katarzyna (Kate) P Adamala is a synthetic biologist and a professor of genetics at the University of Minnesota.

Research 
Adamala's work includes contributions to the field of astrobiology,  synthetic cell engineering and biocomputing.

Her research on prebiotic RNA replication provided an experimental scenario for the RNA world hypothesis of the origin of life.   She has worked on constructing liposome bioreactor synthetic cells.

She is a founder and steering group member of the Build-a-Cell Initiative, an international collaboration for creation of synthetic live cells. She is a co-founder of synthetic cell company Synlife.
Adamala and Szostak demonstrated non enzymatic RNA replication in primitive protocells is only possibly in presence of weak cation chelator like citric acid, providing further evidence for central role of citric acid in primordial metabolism.

References

External links 
 Lab webpage
 Kate Adamala: Life but Not Alive TEDx talk
 Mindscape Podcast Kate Adamala on Creating Synthetic Life
 Kate Adamala: Breakthrough Discuss 2019

Living people
Year of birth missing (living people)
Synthetic biologists
American bioengineers
Astrobiologists
University of Warsaw alumni
Harvard University alumni
University of Minnesota faculty